Aphaniotis fusca, the dusky earless agama or peninsular earless agama,  is a species of lizard in the family Agamidae. The species is found in Thailand, Malaysia, and Indonesia.

References

Aphaniotis
Reptiles of Indonesia
Reptiles described in 1864
Taxa named by Wilhelm Peters
Reptiles of Borneo